La Roche-Blanche is a commune in the Puy-de-Dôme department in Auvergne in central France.

Population

Twin towns 
The commune is twinned with:
  Empfingen, Germany

See also 
 Gergovie
 Communes of the Puy-de-Dôme department

References

External links 

 La Roche-Blanche on the Institut géographique national site
 La Roche-Blanche on the Insee site

Rocheblanche